Energy is an American punk rock band, from Stoughton, Massachusetts, formed in 2006.

History

Formation and Punch The Clock (2006-2007)

In 2006, Energy - which took its name from the title of punk rock band  Operation Ivy's first release, formed before independently releasing their EP Punch The Clock, through Rock Vegas Records in 2007.

In August of that year, the band went on to play This Is Hardcore Festival alongside band such as Agnostic Front,  Paint It Black, Have Heart, and Crime In Stereo.

Bridge 9 Records era: Invasions of the Mind, Race The Sun, & Walk Into the Fire (2008-2011)

After touring with The Carrier in March of 2008, the band signed with Bridge 9 Records in May, to release their debut LP Invasions of the Mind, and EP Race The Sun.

In early July the band toured with Carry The Torch, and Heavy Hearted.

Throughout August/September they did a month long US tour with the band Know The Score.

The band then toured the U.S. with H2O, Bane, and Cruel Hand in October, followed by their first European tour in support of Slapshot, alongside All for Nothing, in November, with one of the dates being Persistence Tour. Ending the year with a mini holiday tour with Set Your Goals, Four Year Strong and Every Avenue.

In March 2009, they toured the US with the band Defeater, before touring in May with The Mongoloids and Ambush!.

April would bring the band to New England Metal and Hardcore Festival XI 2009 where they would play alongside notable bands such as Lamb of God, As I Lay Dying, Children Of Bodom, God Forbid, Municipal Waste, Emmure, Winds Of Plague, All Shall Perish, Austrian Death Machine, iwrestledabearonce, Terror, Defeater, Have Heart, and Trapped Under Ice.

July they toured with Fallen From The Sky, and Debaser, playing Significant Festival 2009.

In September they did a headlining tour with support from A Loss For Words, and The Wonder Years.

October 2010 brought the release of the EP Walk Into The Fire.

With the release of the single "Secrets" in April 2011, came their departure from Bridge 9 Records shortly after.

Children of the Night (2011)

Forming in the fall of 2004, Children of the Night, a side project put together by singer Jason Tankerley and songwriter/producer Mike Rendini, began doing complex renditions of Misfits songs, before putting together original material containing the same morbid feel crossed with the catchiness of 50s Doo-Wop and early 60's rock n roll.

Initially self released under the Children of the Night moniker in 2006, the aforementioned material saw a proper release in 2011, as Energy's Children of the Night EP.

Apparition Sound, I Play for Keeps, & A Tribute to the Misfits (2012-2016)

After becoming the sole songwriter for Energy in 2012, Jason Tankerley began writing songs for what would eventually make up Energy's 2016 album Apparition Sound, released through Monster Party Records.

During this time, Energy released the single "I Play for Keeps" in February of 2012 and a music video for the song "Another Yesterday" in October.

The band then went on to release their Misfits tribute album a Tribute to the Misfits, February of 2014.(Down for Anything Records)

October 2015 saw the release of the music video for their cover of the Ramones' classic "Pet Sematary".

In 2016, the band released their music video for "They".

Under the Mask and UK tours (2017)

In March 2017, the band toured the UK for the first time ever with Creeper, Puppy, and Milk Teeth.

May brought the release of the music video for "A Prayer for Rain".

On July 21, the band released the EP Under the Mask through Shadowland Productions, which was followed by their first ever headlining tour of the U.K. with Miss Vincent as the support act.

Energy (2018-present)

Energy then went on to release a self titled compilation album Energy in 2018, which is a compilation album spanning the first five years (2012-2017) of lead singer Jason's musical output as the band's sole songwriter.

It was announced in June of 2021 that Energy will be releasing a cover version of the Samhain song "Archangel” for the album "World Without End: An Underground Tribute To Samhain" on July 9th, 2021 via Black Donut Records.

Musical style and influence
The band's musical style has been described as punk rock, melodic hardcore, horror punk and pop punk, drawing from a wide range of musical influences from bands like The Misfits, The Ramones, Rancid, AFI, 7 Seconds, Minor Threat and Black Flag, to other influences such as Weezer, The Smashing Pumpkins, The Beach Boys and The Cure.

Over the years, Tankerley's vocal delivery has been compared to the likes of Davey Havok (AFI), Michale Graves (ex-misfits), and Zoltán Téglás (ex-Pennywise) while adding his own vast array of vocal influences.

The band has been cited as an influence by Creeper and Our Time Down Here.

Discography

Albums

Extended plays

Live albums

Compilations

Singles
 Secrets (2011)
 The Letter (2011)
 Another Yesterday (2012)
 25 Holidays (2012)
 The Witching Hour (2017)
 A Prayer for Rain (2017)
 Leave Me Alone (2019)
 Archangel (2021)

Music Videos

Members

Current line-up
 Jason Tankerley - lead vocals (2006–present), guitar, bass, drums (2012–present)

Past members
 Mikey D. - guitar (2006)
 Burton Wright - drums (2006)
 Rob Spearin - guitar (2006—2007)
 Joe Freedman - guitar (2007—2010)
 Dan Mancini - guitar (2007—2010)
 Mike Assatly - drums (2006—2008)
 Craig Kenyon - drums (2008)
 Justin Flaherty - drums (2008)
 Keith Sidorowicz - drums (2008—2011)
 Kevin Thompson - drums (2011—2014)
 Mike Rendini - keyboard (2009-2011), guitar (2011—2012)
 Conor O'Brien - bass (2006—2012)
 Chris Pina - guitar (2011—2016)
 Jeremy Nichols - guitar (2012—2014)
 John Paolilli - guitar (2015—2016)
 Nick Sullivan - rhythm guitar (touring 2016-2017)
 Steve Duarte - lead guitar (touring 2016-2017)
 Mike Natsios - bass (touring 2016-2017)
 Randy Mason - drums (touring 2016-2017)
 Eric Molloy - drums (2017)

Timeline

References

External links
 
 Energy discography at Discogs

Melodic hardcore groups
Horror punk groups
Punk rock groups from Massachusetts
Musical groups established in 2006
2006 establishments in Massachusetts
Hardcore punk groups from Massachusetts
Pop punk groups from Massachusetts